Nitzia Scott (born October 10, 1990), better known by her stage name Nitty Scott (formerly known as Nitty Scott, MC), is an American emcee from Brooklyn, New York.  Her breakthrough came in 2010, when the video for her freestyle over "Monster" went viral. She has performed at the BET hip hop awards and the Brooklyn Hip Hop Festival, among others. Scott released her debut street album The Cassette Chronicles in 2011, followed by her critically acclaimed EP The Boombox Diaries, Vol. 1 in 2012 and her debut album Art Of Chill in 2014. She followed it up with her second album, Creature!, in 2017.

Biography
Scott was born in Michigan and raised in Orlando, Florida. Her mother is Puerto Rican and her father is African American from New Orleans. Scott started rapping at the age of 14, while she was attending art school with a major in creative writing. She found writing a form of personal expression and was creating poetry before transitioning to become a musician. At the age of 17, she moved to Brooklyn, New York to pursue a career as a rapper. She graduated from the Secondary School for Journalism at John Jay High School in Park Slope, Brooklyn. While in New York, Scott created the Boombox Family hip-hop movement to "preserve and progress hip-hop culture". Due to internal changes, Nitty dissolved the Boombox Family label in 2014 and began other independent business ventures. In an interview with MSN she stated that if she hadn't pursued a career as a musician, she would have attended college to study Journalism and Broadcast Communications.

In 2011, she performed at the BET Hip Hop Awards participating in one of several cyphers among DJ Premier, Estelle and Lecrae. She was also part of the 2011 Brooklyn Hip Hop Festival lineup, headlined by Q-Tip. In 2012, Scott performed at the Royal Arena Festival in Switzerland among Ice Cube and Mos Def.

Scott released her first official EP The Boombox Diaries, Vol. 1 on August 28, 2012. The record features production from 6th Sense, AraabMuzik, Cassius Clay, DJ Tedsmooth, !llmind and J57, and has guest appearances by Kendrick Lamar, Action Bronson and The Kid Daytona, among others. It was supported by the lead single "Auntie Maria's Crib". The EP received the Editor's Pick at DJ Booth. In a positive review, Nick De Molina of XXL gave it an XL rating, describing Nitty as a "conscious rapper" and praised the production as "strong and diverse".

On June 16, 2013, Scott released her video for the song "Flower Child" featuring Kendrick Lamar on MTV Jams. The video shoot was completely funded through the support of fans and contributors to her Kickstarter campaign.
On May 23, 2014, Scott released her debut album The Art of Chill.

In 2017, Scott released her second full length album, Creature!

In 2021, Scott released her third album, Jiggy Mami.

On September 18, 2021, Scott performed at Miami Beach Pride.

On September 25, 2021, Scott performed live in Cincinnati, Ohio for the second annual “In Her Voice” community music event hosted by Queens Village and Underworld Jazz Festival where she opened for Sa-Roc.

Musical style and influences 
Scott's rapping style has been compared to that of MC Lyte, Lauryn Hill, Ladybug Mecca, and Big Pun. She has stated that she is influenced by the Wu-Tang Clan, A Tribe Called Quest and Slum Village, among others. In Creature!, Scott explores her Afro-Boricua identity through sonic references to Afro-Caribbean musical cultures; tracks on the album include collaborations with Taíno artists, recordings of indigenous coquí frogs, and tumba drums, all meant to evoke a pre-colonial past.

Discography

Solo albums

Collaborative albums

EPs 
2012 – The Boombox Diaries, Vol. 1
2019 – 7 (A collaborative EP with The Polish Ambassador, real name David Sugalski)

Mixtapes 
2011 – The Cassette Chronicles
2011 – Doobies x Popsicle Sticks

Singles 
2011 – "Truth"
2012 – "Auntie Maria's Crib"
2016 – "Hieroglyphics"
2016 – "Negrita"
2016 – "All The Flowers"
2016 – "We Are One"
2017 – "BBYGRL" 
2017 – "Buddhaveli"
2021 – "Changing That"
2021 – "Beeper (Remix)" (with Sos B4L)
2021 – "BLACKARITA"

Featured singles 
2013 – "Dusk Till Dawn" (Syler feat. DJ JS-1 and Nitty Scott, MC)
2015 – "Not Impressed" (with Julie Anne San Jose)
2016 – "No Darkness Tonight" (with Blasco Says)
2020 - "Danger" (RDGLDGRN featuring Nitty Scott & Alexandra Stan)
2021 – "Four Better or Worse" (with Damu the Fudgemunk)

Guest appearances 

2010 – "Pop a Bottle (Remix)" (Paris Jones feat. Nitty Scott, MC and VA)
2011 – "Daydream" (Rocky Rivera feat. Nitty Scott, MC)
2011 – "Black Swan" (Statik Selektah feat. Nitty Scott, MC and Rapsody)
2012 – "How I Fly" (Styles P feat. Nitty Scott, MC, Currensy and Avery Storm)
2012 – "Paid Dues" (Esohel feat. Nitty Scott, MC)
2012 – "Fatal Attraction" (Jared Evan feat. Nitty Scott, MC)
2012 – "Never Back Down" (Rah Digga feat. Nitty Scott, MC)
2012 - "Red Sky Morning" (Gangstagrass feat Nitty Scott, MC)
2012 - "Country Blues" (Gangstagrass feat Brandi Hard & Nitty Scott, MC)
2012 – "Any Means Necessary" (Kinetics feat. Nitty Scott, MC)
2012 – "Strangers" (Kinetics & One Love feat. Nitty Scott, MC)
2013 – "World Premiere" (Megadon feat. Nitty Scott, MC and Mr. Cheeks)
2013 – "Like a Prayer" (J57 feat. Nitty Scott, MC)
2013 – "We Ain't You" (Troy Ave feat. Nitty Scott, MC and CJ Fly)
2013 – "Bars For Days" (Termanology feat. Nitty Scott, MC and Easy Money)
2013 – "Boyz II Men" (Blu & Nottz feat. Nitty Scott, MC)
2015 – "Not Impressed" (Julie Anne San Jose feat. Nitty Scott, MC)
2019 – "SONIA" (Jamila Woods feat. Nitty Scott)
2019 – "Get Together" (Gang Starr feat. Ne-Yo & Nitty Scott)

Videos 
2010 – "Monster (Freestyle)"
2011 – "Tell Somebody" (Directed by Conor Shillen)
2011 – "Auntie Maria's Crib" (Directed by Giuliano Jules)
2012 – "Bullshit Rap" (Directed by Donald Robinson Cole and Robert Adam Mayer)
2012 – "Express Yourself" (Directed by Ulysses)
2012 – "Planes, Trains and Automobiles" (Directed by Luke Wilson and Alexander Akande)
2012 – "Paid Dues" (Directed by Sense Hernandez)
2013 – "World Premiere" (Directed by Donald Robinson Cole)
2013 – "Bath Salt (Freestyle)" (Directed by Streets Riley)
2013 – "Flower Child" (Directed by Anthony Sylvester)
2013 – "Skippin Clouds" (Directed by Kendra MacLeod)
2015 – "Generation Now" (Directed by Nitzia Scott)
2015 – "U.F.O. (Unfiltered Offering)" (Directed by John Greene)
2017 – "Pxssy Powah!" (Directed by Damien Sandoval)
2017 – "La Diaspora" (Directed by Cutter Hodierne)

References

External links 
 
 

1990 births
American women rappers
African-American women rappers
American people of Puerto Rican descent
Living people
Musicians from Michigan
Rappers from Florida
Rappers from Brooklyn
Puerto Rican women rappers
Underground rappers
21st-century American rappers
21st-century American women musicians
21st-century African-American women
Hispanic and Latino American rappers
21st-century women rappers